Michael Kafui Helegbe (born 15 September 1985) is a Ghanaian professional footballer who plays as a midfielder for Jordanian club Shabab Al-Aqaba.

Club career 
Helegbe started his professional career with Ghanaian Premier League club Liberty Professionals in 2003, before being sent on a  6-month loan to Norwegian side SK Brann on 21 April 2005 with the option of extension for another two years. On 1 July 2005, Helegbe returned to Liberty Professionals.

In January 2007, Helegbe signed a three-and-a-half-year contract with French Ligue 2 side En Avant de Guingamp.  The Ghanaian midfielder left Guingamp after two years, in August 2009, to join Belgian Second Division club KV Oostende on a one-year deal.

On 29 September 2010, Helegbe returned to Liberty Professionals in Ghana. After two years with Liberty, in September 2012 he moved to Asante Kotoko. On 1 December 2013, Helegbe signed for Medeama.

After two seasons with Lebanese Premier League side Tripoli, where he played 43 league games and scored 22 goals, Helegbe moved to Salam Zgharta. After one season, Helegbe moved to Jordan, playing for Mansheyat Bani Hasan. In 2018 he moved to Shabab Al-Aqaba.

International career 
Helegbe made his first international cap playing for the Ghana national team against Austria on 24 March 2007, at the UPC-Arena, Graz, Austria. He was also the captain of the Ghana Olympic football team.

Honours 
Individual
 Lebanese Premier League Team of the Season: 2014–15

References

External links
 
 

1985 births
Living people
Footballers from Accra
Ghanaian footballers
Association football midfielders
Ghana Premier League players
Liberty Professionals F.C. players
Ghanaian expatriate footballers
Expatriate footballers in Norway
Ghanaian expatriate sportspeople in Norway
Eliteserien players
SK Brann players
Expatriate footballers in France
Ghanaian expatriate sportspeople in France
Ligue 2 players
En Avant Guingamp players
Expatriate footballers in Belgium
Ghanaian expatriate sportspeople in Belgium
Challenger Pro League players
K.V. Oostende players
Asante Kotoko S.C. players
Medeama SC players
Expatriate footballers in Lebanon
Ghanaian expatriate sportspeople in Lebanon
Lebanese Premier League players
AC Tripoli players
Salam Zgharta FC players
Expatriate footballers in Jordan
Ghanaian expatriate sportspeople in Jordan
Mansheyat Bani Hasan players
Shabab Al-Aqaba Club players
Ghana international footballers